The École Pour l'Informatique et les Techniques Avancées, more commonly known as EPITA, is a private French grande école specialized in the field of computer science and software engineering created in 1984 by Patrice Dumoucel. It is a private engineering school, member of IONIS Education Group since 1994, accredited by the Commission des titres d'ingénieur (CTI) to deliver the French Diplôme d'Ingénieur, and based at Le Kremlin-Bicêtre south of Paris.

In June 2013, EPITA becomes member of the Union of Independent Grandes Écoles, which includes 30 grandes écoles.

The school is part of IONIS Education Group.

Studies

French Stream

Preparatory class 

The first two years of studies are preparatory years. During these two years, students study mathematics, physics and electronics as well as algorithmics and computer science.

Engineering class

The first year 

The third year is the first year of engineering studies, where students learn the fundamentals in information technology and software engineering. This year is also famous for its first month, during which students will be asked to make several projects, which generally lead them to code more than 15 hours per day. Third year students are known to say that "sleeping is cheating" and usually remember this year as their most painstaking year at EPITA.

Majors 

During the fourth and fifth years students have to choose one of the nine majors:

 IMAGE, Traitement et synthèse d'image ("Image processing and synthesis")
 SRS, Systèmes, Réseaux et Sécurité ("Systems, Networks and Security")
 MTI, Multimédia et Technologies de l'Information ("Multimedia and Information Technology")
 SCIA, Sciences Cognitives et Informatique Avancée ("Cognitive Science and Advanced Computer Science")
 SANTÉ, Data science généraliste (General data science)
 GISTRE, Génie Informatique des Systèmes Temps Réel et Embarqués ("Computer Engineering, Real-time Systems and Embedded System")
 SIGL, Systèmes d’Information et Génie Logiciel ("Information Systems and Software Engineering")
 TCOM, Télécommunications ("Telecommunication")
 GITM, Global IT Management (Entirely taught in English)
RECHERCHE, (Majeure double compétence orientée vers la recherche académique)

International Stream 
The Department of International Programs is currently offering 5 programs:

 International Bachelor of Computer Science   The program boosts a comprehensive curriculum, offering interdisciplinary courses in computer programming, algorithms and computer architecture. It is composed of 6 semesters over a period of 3 years, including internship and French classes. Graduates of this program will have the possibility of pursuing our Master programs.
 Master of Science in Computer Science  The program provides a perfect combination of the most important and powerful theoretical basis of computing, and their applications in the areas of current technology and professional fields. It includes courses common to all students as well as specific semesters depending on students's choice of specialization. The 4 specializations are as follows:
 Innovative Information Systems Management
 Software Engineering
 Computer Security
 Data Science & Analytics
 Master of Science in Artificial Intelligence Systems  The program trains students to solve complex problems using AI techniques and tools through equipping them with a solid foundation of mathematics and programming skills. It also expands students’ interpersonal and commercial capacities so that they can adapt to the ever-evolving business environment.trains students to solve complex problems using AI techniques and tools through equipping them with a solid foundation of mathematics and programming skills. It also expands students’ interpersonal and commercial capacities so that they can adapt to the ever-evolving business environment.
 Master of Science in Artificial Intelligence for Marketing Strategy  A joint degree with EM Normandie Business School, the program equips students with AI skills so that they can apply the technology to enhancing an organization's marketing strategies and decision-making process. It is open to candidates holding a 4-year bachelor's degree (or higher) or a 3-year bachelor's degree with professional experience, regardless of their discipline.
 Master of Computer Engineering   Accredited by the Commission des titres d'ingénieur (CTI), the program prepares students to become computer engineers who can easily find a professional position anywhere in the world. Graduates of this program will be awarded the “diplôme d’ingénieur” and will possess both technical and soft skills. They will have a wide choice on the job market whether they choose a career in France or abroad.

References

External links 

  Official website
  The Multimedia and Information Technology major
  The Information Systems and Software Engineering major
  The Systems, Network and Security major
  The Research and Development laboratory
  The Systems and Security laboratory
  The Innovation laboratory

Educational institutions established in 1984
Education in Île-de-France
Education in Lyon
Education in Rennes
Education in Toulouse
Education in Strasbourg
Grandes écoles
1984 establishments in France